Eolorica is a fossilized loriciferan from the mid-Cambrian Deadwood Formation of Saskatchewan, Canada, preserved as a Small Carbonaceous Fossil.

References

Loricifera